The Sperm (or Asujaak) is a 2007 Thai science fiction comedy film directed by Taweewat Wantha.

Plot
A young, struggling Bangkok rock musician, Sutin, constantly dreams about almost having sex with sexy model-actress La-mai, but always wakes up before he can actually have sex. When he wins a chance to appear in a battle of the bands contest, and La-mai presents the prize, he is not sure he is dreaming, so he crudely propositions La-mai on live television. Embarrassed by what he's done, Sutin proceeds to go out to dinner with his bandmates and become very intoxicated. Later that night, he masturbates in front of a poster of La-mai, and then the next day thousands of women in the city become pregnant. The women then give birth to abnormal, fast-growing babies that all look like Sutin.

Observing the proceedings is a scientist, Dr. Satifeung, and assisted by his daughter, he tries to come up with a way to stop the "look alike gang", but soon there are bigger problems.

Cast
Leo Putt as Sutin
Pimpaporn Leenutapong as La-mai
Somlek Sakdikul as Dr. Satifeung
Dollaros Dachapratumwan as Doctor's daughter
Nuttawut Srimhog as Prasert
Chakrapong Siririn as Surachai

External links
Official site

2007 films
Sahamongkol Film International films
Thai science fiction comedy films
Thai-language films
2000s sex comedy films
2007 comedy films